Shandong Airlines Co,.Ltd. (nicknamed SDA or ) is an airline based in the Shandong Airlines Center in Jinan, Shandong. The Chinese carrier operates a sizable domestic network from Jinan, Qingdao and Yantai to major cities across China, together with an international network to regional Asian destinations. The airline's two largest shareholders are Shandong Aviation Group with a 42% controlling stake and Air China, a strategic partner, holding 22.8% of the airlines shares.

Shandong Airlines was established on 12 March 1994 and started operations in September of the same year. In September 1997 it became a founding member of the New Star (Xinxing) Aviation Alliance together with five other Chinese provincial airlines. The purpose of the alliance was to improve finances and deter takeover from larger competitors. The airline's first of many new international services commenced on 8 June 2004  connecting Jinan to Singapore.

On 21 April 2014, Shandong Airlines committed to order 50 Boeing 737s, including 16 Next-Generation 737s and 34 737 MAXes.

Destinations

As of July 2020, Shandong Airlines operates flights to the following destinations:

Codeshare agreements
Shandong Airlines has codeshare agreements with the following airlines:

 Air China
 Asiana Airlines
 China Express Airlines
 EVA Air
 Qingdao Airlines
 Shenzhen Airlines
 Sichuan Airlines
 Uni Air

Fleet

Current fleet

, Shandong Airlines operates the following aircraft:

Former fleet

References

External links

  Official website
  Official website

Airlines of China
Chinese brands
Airlines established in 1994
Jinan
Air China
1994 establishments in China
Companies based in Jinan